No Place to Be is an album release from Hasidic reggae artist Matisyahu. The album does not contain any previously unreleased songs, but all of the tracks are remixed or rerecorded versions of old songs. It also contains a cover of "Message in a Bottle" by The Police previously available only on Yahoo! Music.

Packaged with the CD is a DVD titled Live in Israel directed by Matt Skerritt, produced by Gregg Gilmore and Calvin Aurand. The DVD features live footage of Matisyahu's first concert in Israel as well as his latest music video, for Jerusalem (Out of Darkness Comes Light).

Track listing

CD

DVD

The DVD also contains 11 interviews with Matisyahu.

References

External links
Rhapsody Album Review
No Place to Be lyrics

Matisyahu albums
Albums produced by Bill Laswell
2006 live albums
2006 video albums
Live video albums
Epic Records live albums
Epic Records video albums